Mario Ochoa Gil (born 7 November 1927, date of death unknown) was a Mexican football midfielder who played for Mexico in the 1950 and 1954 FIFA World Cups. He also played for Club América and Club Deportivo Marte.

Ochoa is deceased.

References

External links
FIFA profile

1927 births
Year of death missing
Mexican footballers
Mexico international footballers
Association football midfielders
Club América footballers
Liga MX players
1950 FIFA World Cup players
1954 FIFA World Cup players